The Flight Design Axxess is a German high-wing, single-place, rigid-wing hang glider that was designed and produced by Flight Design.

Production is complete and the aircraft is no longer available.

Design and development
The Axxess was intended as a high-performance rigid-wing hang glider for competition use. The early production versions had flaps but these were later deleted, as they offered no performance advantage.

The wing structure includes a carbon D-spar, with the wing covered in Dacron sailcloth. The foldable design of the ribs allow for a small packing size. Its  span wing has a nose angle of 165° and the aspect ratio is 12.7:1, with flaps retracted the aspect ratio changed to 13.6:1. In 2003 the aircraft sold for €7241.

The glider was German DHV 3E certified on 20 November 2002.

Specifications (2003 model Axxess)

References

Axxess
Hang gliders